Robert Meglič (born 4 November 1974) is a Slovenian former ski jumper. He competed at the 1994 Winter Olympics.

References

External links

1974 births
Living people
Slovenian male ski jumpers
Sportspeople from Jesenice, Jesenice
Olympic ski jumpers of Slovenia
Ski jumpers at the 1994 Winter Olympics
20th-century Slovenian people